National Highway 140 (NH 140) is a National Highway in the Indian state of Andhra Pradesh.

See also 
 List of National Highways in Andhra Pradesh

References 

National highways in India